This article is about the demographic features of the population of Tanzania, including population density, ethnicity, education level, health of the populace, economic status, religious affiliations, and other aspects of the population.

The population distribution in Tanzania is extremely uneven. Most people live on the northern border or the eastern coast, with much of the remainder of the country being sparsely populated. Approximately 70 percent of the population is rural, although this percentage has been declining since at least 1967. Dar es Salaam is the de facto capital and largest city. Dodoma, located in the centre of Tanzania, is the de jure capital, although action to move government buildings to Dodoma has stalled.

The population consists of about 125 ethnic groups. The Sukuma, Nyamwezi, Chagga, and Haya peoples have more than 1 million members each.

Over 100 different languages are spoken in Tanzania, making it the most linguistically diverse country in East Africa. Among the languages spoken in Tanzania are all four of Africa's language families: Bantu, Cushitic, Nilotic, and Khoisan. Swahili and English are Tanzania's official languages. Swahili belongs to the Bantu branch of the Niger-Congo family. The Sandawe people speak a language that may be related to the Khoe languages of Botswana and Namibia, while the language of the Hadzabe people, although it has similar click consonants, is arguably a language isolate. The language of the Iraqw people is Cushitic. Other languages are Indian languages and Portuguese (spoken by Goans and Mozambicans).

Although much of Zanzibar's native population came from the mainland, one group known as Shirazis traces its origins to the island's early Persian settlers.  Non-Africans residing on the mainland and Zanzibar account for 1 percent of the total population. The Asian community, including Hindus, Sikhs, Shi'a and Sunni Muslims, Parsis, and Goans, has declined by 50 percent in the 2000s and early 2010s to 50,000 on the mainland and 4,000 on Zanzibar. An estimated 70,000 Arabs and 20,000 Europeans (90 percent of which are from the British diaspora) reside in Tanzania. Over 100,000 people living in Tanzania are of Asian or European ancestry.

Based on 1999–2003 data, over 74,000 Tanzanian-born people were living in Organisation for Economic Co-operation and Development countries, with 32,630 residing in the United Kingdom; 19,960 in Canada; 12,225 in the United States; 1,714 in Australia; 1,180 in the Netherlands; and 1,012 in Sweden.

Population

According to the 2012 census, the total population was 44,928,923 compared to 12,313,469 in 1967, resulting in an annual growth rate of 2.9 percent. The under 15 age group represented 44.1 percent of the population, with 35.5 percent being in the 15–35 age group, 52.2 percent being in the 15–64 age group, and 3.8 percent being older than 64.

According to the 2012 revision of the World Population Prospects, children below the age of 15 constituted 44.8 percent of the total population, with 52.0 percent aged 15–64 and 3.1 percent aged 65 or older.

Structure of the population 

Structure of the population (01.07.2013) (Estimates): 

Population Estimates by Sex and Age Group (01.VII.2020):

Vital statistics

The Tanzanian Demographic and Health Survey 2010 estimated that the infant mortality rate for 2005–10 was 51. Registration of other vital events in Tanzania is not complete. The Population Department of the United Nations prepared the following estimates.

Life expectancy

Population numbers

Source:

Fertility and Births (Demographic and Health Surveys)
Total Fertility Rate (TFR) (Wanted Fertility Rate) and Crude Birth Rate (CBR):

Total fertility rate in Tanzania

Fertility rates are estimated by Surveys (TDHS) and Census in different times.
TDHS surveys estimated these fertility rates :6.3 (1991–92), 5.8 (1996), 5.7 (2004–05), 5.4 (2010)
and 2002 Census said 6.3

Other demographic statistics 
The following demographic statistics of Tanzania in 2022 are from the World Population Review.

One birth every 14 seconds	
One death every 1 minutes	
One net migrant every 13 minutes	
Net gain of one person every 18 seconds

The following demographic statistics are from the CIA World Factbook, unless otherwise indicated.

Population
63,852,892 (2022 est.)
55,451,343 (July 2018 est.)
48,261,942 (July 2013 est.)

Religions
Christian 63.1%, Muslim 34.1%, folk religion 1.1%, Buddhist <1%, Hindu <1%, Jewish <1%, other <1%, unspecified 1.6% (2020 est.)

note: Zanzibar is almost entirely Muslim

Age structure

0-14 years: 42.7% (male 12,632,772/female 12,369,115)
15-24 years: 20.39% (male 5,988,208/female 5,948,134)
25-54 years: 30.31% (male 8,903,629/female 8,844,180)
55-64 years: 3.52% (male 954,251/female 1,107,717)
65 years and over: 3.08% (male 747,934/female 1,056,905) (2020 est.) 

0-14 years: 43.4% (male 12,159,482 /female 11,908,654)
15-24 years: 20.03% (male 5,561,922 /female 5,543,788)
25-54 years: 30.02% (male 8,361,460 /female 8,284,229)
55-64 years: 3.51% (male 872,601 /female 1,074,480)
65 years and over: 3.04% (male 706,633 /female 978,094) (2018 est.)

Median age
total: 18.2 years. Country comparison to the world: 212nd
male: 17.9 years
female: 18.4 years (2020 est.)

total: 17.9 years. Country comparison to the world: 215th
male: 17.6 years
female: 18.2 years (2018 est.)

total:  17.3 years
male:   17.0 years
female: 17.6 years (2013 est.)

Birth rate
33.3 births/1,000 population (2022 est.) Country comparison to the world: 21st
35.3 births/1,000 population (2018 est.) Country comparison to the world: 19th

Death rate
5.09 deaths/1,000 population (2022 est.) Country comparison to the world: 192nd
7.5 deaths/1,000 population (2018 est.) Country comparison to the world: 112nd

Total fertility rate
4.39 children born/woman (2022 est.) Country comparison to the world: 20th
4.71 children born/woman (2018 est.) Country comparison to the world: 20th

Population growth rate
2.78% (2022 est.) Country comparison to the world: 13rd
2.74% (2018 est.) Country comparison to the world: 14th

Mother's mean age at first birth
19.8 years (2015/16 est.)
note: median age at first birth among women 25-29

Contraceptive prevalence rate
38.4% (2015/16)

Net migration rate
-0.41 migrant(s)/1,000 population (2022 est.) Country comparison to the world: 123rd
-0.5 migrant(s)/1,000 population (2018 est.) Country comparison to the world: 127th

Dependency ratios
total dependency ratio: 93.4 (2015 est.)
youth dependency ratio: 87.4 (2015 est.)
elderly dependency ratio: 6 (2015 est.)
potential support ratio: 16.6 (2015 est.)

Urbanization
urban population: 36.7% of total population (2022)
rate of urbanization: 4.89% annual rate of change (2020-25 est.)

urban population: 33.8% of total population (2018)
rate of urbanization: 5.22% annual rate of change (2015-20 est.)

Major infectious diseases
degree of risk: very high (2020)
food or waterborne diseases: bacterial diarrhea, hepatitis A, and typhoid fever
vectorborne diseases: malaria, dengue fever, and Rift Valley fever
water contact diseases: schistosomiasis
animal contact diseases: rabies

Ethnic groups

mainland - African 99% (of which 95% are Bantu consisting of more than 130 tribes), other 1% (consisting of Asian, European, and Arab); Zanzibar - Arab, African, mixed Arab and African. Around 100,000 people living in Tanzania are from Europe or Asia.

Sex ratio
at birth:              1.03 male(s)/female
0-14 years:        1.02 male(s)/female
15–54 years:       1.00 male(s)/female
55-64 years:       0.75 male(s)/female
65 years and over: 0.76 male(s)/female
total population:  0.99 male(s)/female (2013 estimate)

Life expectancy at birth
total population: 70.19 years. Country comparison to the world: 169th
male: 68.42 years
female: 72.02 years (2022 est.)

total population: 63.1 years
male: 61.6 years
female: 64.6 years (2018 est.)

total population: 60.76 years
male:   59.48 years
female: 62.09 years (2013 estimate)

HIV/AIDS

Age 15-49 HIV infection rates:
4.5 percent overall, with 6.2 percent of women and 3.8 percent of men being infected.

People living with HIV/AIDS:
1.5 million (2017 est.)

Deaths:
32,000 (2017 est.)

Languages

Kiswahili or Swahili or Kiunguja (in Zanzibar) (official)
English (official)
Arabic (widely spoken in Zanzibar)

Education expenditures
3.1% of GDP (2020) Country comparison to the world: 146th

Literacy
definition: age 15 and over can read and write Swahili, English, or Arabic
total population: 77.9%
male: 83.2%
female: 73.1% (2015 est.)

total population: 69.4%
male:             77.5%
female:           62.2% (2003 est.)

School life expectancy (primary to tertiary education)
total: 9 years
male: 9 years
female: 9 years (2020)

Unemployment, youth ages 15-24
total: 3.9%
male: 3.1%
female: 4.6% (2014 est.)

Religions

Most Tanzanians are nowadays Christians and Muslims. The numerical relationship between followers of the two religions is regarded as politically sensitive and questions about religious affiliation have not been included in census questionnaires since 1967.

For many years estimates have been repeated that about a third of the population each follows Islam, Christianity and traditional religions.
As there is likely no longer such a large percentage of traditional religionists, a range of competing estimates has been published giving one side or the other a large share or trying to show equal shares.

Estimates from the Pew Report Islam and Christianity (2010) were 60% Christian and 36% Muslim.

The remainder of the population are Hindus, Buddhists, animists, and unaffiliated. Most Christians are Roman Catholic, Lutheran, Anglican or Pentecostal, though a number of other churches, as Seventh-Day Adventist, and Eastern Orthodox Christians are also represented in the country. Most Tanzanian Muslims are Sunni Muslims, though there are also populations of Ibadi, Shia, Ahamadiya, Bohora. Muslims are concentrated in coastal areas and in mainland areas along former caravan trade routes.

See also
 List of ethnic groups in Tanzania

References